In music, Op. 165 stands for Opus number 165. Compositions that are assigned this number include:

 Albéniz – Tango in D
 Reinecke – Ein Märchen ohne Worte
 Saint-Saëns – Le printemps